The 2018 European Throwing Cup is held on 10–11 March at the Estádio Dr. Magalhães Pessoa and National Throwing
Centre in Leiria, Portugal. It is the eighteenth edition of the athletics competition for throwing events and was jointly organised by the European Athletic Association. The competition featured men's and women's contests in shot put, discus throw, javelin throw and hammer throw. In addition to the senior competitions, there were also under-23 events for younger athletes.

Medal summary

Senior

Under-23

Teams Standings
Full results.

Senior

Under 23

References

External links
Official website

European Throwing Cup
International athletics competitions hosted by Portugal
European Cup Throwing
Throwing
European Cup Throwing
European Cup Throwing